Aging is the effect of time on a person.

Aging or ageing may also refer to:

Biology
 Senescence, the biological effect of time on an organism
 Aging in cats
 Aging in dogs

Demography
 Population ageing, a shift in the distribution of a population towards older ages

Chemistry and materials science
 Polymer degradation, a change of polymer properties due to environmental factors
 Precipitation hardening, a heat treatment of materials
 Ostwald ripening, precipitate or deposit aging in chemistry
 Ageing (textiles), after treatment of textiles

Food preparation
 Aging (food), the leaving of a product to improve its flavor
 Aging of wine, the effect of time on wine
 Barrel aging, a method of maturing wine, spirits, etc.
 Beef aging, a process of preparing beef for consumption
 Cheese ripening, a process in cheesemaking

Computers
 Aging (file system), a tendency towards data fragmentation in file systems
 Aging (scheduling), an operating system technique for resource allocation
 Software aging, the tendency of software to exhibit problems as time passes by

Other uses
 Aging (artwork), a process by which an artwork is made to appear old
 Aging (journal), a medical journal

See also
 Age (disambiguation)